Abdoulaye Sané (born 15 October 1992) is a Senegalese professional footballer who plays as a forward for Churchill Brothers in the I-League.

Career
Sané began his career with AS Douanes in the Senegal Premier League. In the summer of 2011, he moved to Rennes. After two years with Rennes, he was loaned to Laval to gain more playing time, in the French second tier.

After becoming out of contract with Rennes in 2016, he signed with Red Star FC.

After a successful 2017–18 season in the French third tier with Red Star FC in which he scored 15 goals, he signed with second-tier Sochaux on 1 June 2018.

On 9 August 2020, Sané signed a two-year deal with Al-Taawoun.

On 13 August 2022, Sané signed with I-League club Churchill Brothers on a one-year deal. He took part in the 2022 Baji Rout Cup, where Churchill Brothers finished runners-up. He scored three goals in two appearances. He made his league debut on 15 November against Rajasthan United in their 2–1 defeat.

Career statistics

Club

Honours
Churchill Brothers
Baji Rout Cup runner-up: 2022

References

External links
 
 Abdoulaye Sané's profile, stats & pics
 

1992 births
Living people
Association football forwards
Senegalese footballers
Senegal international footballers
Stade Rennais F.C. players
Stade Lavallois players
Red Star F.C. players
FC Sochaux-Montbéliard players
Al-Taawoun FC players
Ligue 1 players
Ligue 2 players
Championnat National players
Championnat National 3 players
Saudi Professional League players
2011 CAF U-23 Championship players
Expatriate footballers in Saudi Arabia
Senegalese expatriate sportspeople in Saudi Arabia